Dan Allan Waldemar Svensson (born 16 February 1951) is a Swedish actor perhaps mostly known for his role as Gustav Svensson in the hit comedy series Svensson, Svensson. Besides acting in films, television and on stage, Svensson owns and runs the film production company Ridåfall AB.

Biography
Svensson was born in Stockholm but grew up in Tranemo, Sweden. At the age of seventeen he moved to Värnamo and started high school studies. At the end of the 1970s, Svensson enrolled for acting studies at Skara Skolscen and then at Teaterhögskolan in Gothenburg.

His first television role was as Erik in Hedebyborna. He has worked as part of the Stockholm stadsteater ensemble, acted in films and on television and also directed. The theatre and television roles have varied, from playing Cyrano at Oscarsteatern to playing the everyday stereotypical Swede Gustav Svensson in the SVT comedy show Svensson, Svensson and the role of RF Simpson in the Swedish version of the musical Singing in the Raun at Oscarsteatern.

During the summer of 2007, Svensson performed on stage comedy shows in Växjö in the play Kuta och Kör where he had the lead role. Also in 2007, Svensson played Santa Claus on Julkalendern on SVT. In 2008 he acted in the TV4 miniseries Maria Wern – Främmande fågel alongside Eva Röse.

In November 2013, Svensson revealed that he was to play "Kapten Klänning" more known as Göran Lindberg a former police chief who was imprisoned in 2010 for sexually abusing a number of women. The play "Fallet Kapten Klänning" was performed at Uppsala Stadsteater in Uppsala. In the summer of 2014 Svensson and Robert Gustafsson will work together in the play "Charmörer på vift" at the Krusenstiernska outside theater. Linda Olsson will also appear in the play as the love interest of both the men as "Yvette".

Filmography (selection) 
1978: Hedebyborna (TV)
1985: August Strindberg ett liv (TV)
1986: Hassel – Anmäld försvunnen (TV film)
1986: Mästerdetektiven Basil Mus (voice of Skrället)
1986: Resan till Amerika (voice of Tiger)
1986: Sammansvärjningen (TV)
1987: Saxofonhallicken (TV film)
1988: Strul
1988: Kråsnålen (TV)
1989: Tre kärlekar (TV series, guest role)
1990: Den svarta cirkeln
1990: Bernard och Bianca i Australien (voice of McLeach)
1991: Agnes Cecilia – en sällsam historia
1991: Resan till Amerika - Fievel i vilda västern (voice of Tiger) 
1992: Kejsarn av Portugallien
1994: Svensson, Svensson (TV-series)
1994: Tummelisa (voice of herr Mullvad)
1994: Bert (TV-serie)
1995: Sommaren
1995: Bert: The Last Virgin
1996: Vinterviken
1996: Svensson, Svensson (TV series)
1997: Svensson, Svensson - film
1998: Resan till Amerika - Skatten på Manhattan (voice of Tiger)
1999: Asterix och Obelix möter Caesar (Swedish voice of Obelix)
1999: Resan till Amerika - Mysteriet med nattmonstret (voice of Tiger)
1999: Jakten på en mördare
2000: Hassel - Förgörarna
2000: Hjärta av sten
2000: Kejsarens nya stil (röst som Pacha)
2001: Harry Potter och de vises sten (voice of Rubeus Hagrid)
2002: Monsters, Inc. (Swedish voice for Sulley)
2002: Asterix & Obelix: Uppdrag Kleopatra (voice of Obelix)
2002: Ice Age (röst som Soto)
2002: Harry Potter och Hemligheternas kammare (voice of Rubeus Hagrid)
2003: Håkan Bråkan (Julkalendern at Sveriges television) (Santa Claus, one episode)
2004: The Incredibles (voice of Bob Parr/Mr. Incredible)
2004: Kogänget (röst som hunden Rusty)
2004: Harry Potter och fången från Azkaban (voice Rubeus Hagrid)
2005: God morgon alla barn
2005: Harry Potter och den flammande bägaren (voice of Rubeus Hagrid)
2005: Wallander - Bröderna
2005: Kejsarens nya stil 2 - Kronks nya stil (voice of Pacha)
2006: Tusenbröder - Återkomsten
2006: Göta kanal 2 – Kanalkampen
2007: Svensson, Svensson (TV series)
2007: Harry Potter och Fenixorden (voice of Rubeus Hagrid)
2007: En riktig jul (Julkalendern at Sveriges television)
2008: Svensson, Svensson (TV series)
2008: Maria Wern - Främmande fågel
2008: Oskyldigt dömd
2008: Asterix på olympiaden (voice of Obelix)
2010: Maria Wern - Stum sitter guden
2010: Maria Wern - Alla de stillsamma döda
2011: Åsa-Nisse - wälkom to Knohult
2011: Stockholm - Båstad (TV series)
2011: Maria Wern - Må döden sova
2011: Svensson, Svensson - i nöd och lust
2011: Tintins äventyr: Enhörningens hemlighet (voice of Allan Thompson)
2012: Modig (voice of Lord Dingwall)
2012: Gustafsson 3 tr
2012: Asterix & Obelix och britterna (voice of Obelix)
2012: De fem legenderna 
2013: That Boy Emil 
2013: Monsters University (voice of Sulley)

References

External links 

 

1951 births
20th-century Swedish male actors
21st-century Swedish male actors
Swedish male film actors
Swedish male stage actors
Swedish male television actors
Male actors from Stockholm
Living people